Ernest Francis Acheson (September 19, 1855 – May 16, 1917) was a newspaper editor and a representative to the United States House of Representatives.

Biography
He was born in Washington, Pennsylvania on September 19, 1855, son of Alexander W. and Jane (Wishart) Acheson. He attended the public schools there, and then went on to Washington and Jefferson College in 1875.

He was an honorary graduate of Washington and Jefferson College in 1875; studied law with M. C. Acheson at Washington, Pennsylvania, was admitted to the bar in 1877 and practiced law there until 1879. He purchased the newspaper Washington Weekly Observer, of which he was editor. In 1889, he established a daily edition of the same paper. He received the honorary degree of A.M., from Washington and Jefferson College in 1889.

On November 22, 1882, he was married to Jannie B., daughter of Galbraith Stewart.

He was elected as a Republican to the United States House of Representatives in 1894, and continued to serve until 1909, having been an unsuccessful candidate for the nomination in 1908. Acheson was served in the 54th, 55th, 56th, 57th and 58th congresses. He became president of the Pennsylvania editorial association in January, 1893, and recording secretary of the National Editorial Association in June, 1893.

In 1909 he returned to editorial work until his retirement in 1912. He died in Washington, Pennsylvania, in 1917.

References

Citations

Sources

External links
The Political Graveyard

1855 births
1917 deaths
Editors of Pennsylvania newspapers
Politicians from Pittsburgh
Washington & Jefferson College alumni
Republican Party members of the United States House of Representatives from Pennsylvania
19th-century American politicians